The Force was an American, Grass Valley, California-based punk/hardcore band. Members Matt Wedgley (Viva Hate, Dirty Filthy Mugs), Hunter Burgan (AFI), Mark Roustabout (The Roustabouts), and Chad Cox were all in different punk bands, before forming The Force in May 1995. Between 1996 and 1998, The Force released a single, an EP and a split single", as well as a number of songs on compilation albums. The Force split up in September 1998. Since then, members of The Force have gone on to form or join several notable bands. On August 28–31, 2008, The Force reunited for the first time in ten years to play four shows in California. The Force also released a complete discography on 12" vinyl containing every song they ever recorded.

Discography
 Fettish EP (1996), Wedge Records
 "I Don't Like You Either" (1997), Spider Club Music
 Split EP with The Traitors (1998), Johann's Face Records
 Complete Discography (2008)

Compilations
 One Big Happy Slam Pit (1996), Spider Club Music
 Punk Fiction, Wedge Records
 Weeds in the Garden, Paco Garden Records
 No Time to Kill (1999), Checkmate Records
 For Those About to Trip (Rich Kids on LSD Tribute), Malt Soda Recordings
 Bottled Violence, Out of Step Records

References

Punk rock groups from California
Hardcore punk groups from California